Halysidota underwoodi, or Underwood's tussock moth, is a moth of the family Erebidae. It was described by Walter Rothschild in 1909. It is found in Mexico, Guatemala, Nicaragua, Costa Rica, Panama, Colombia, Venezuela, Ecuador, Peru and Bolivia.

The species was named after Cecil F. Underwood.

The larvae feed on Acalypha species.

References

Halysidota
Moths described in 1909